José Valle Román (June 19, 1920 in Buenos Aires – September 16, 1997 in Buenos Aires) was an Argentine professional football player and coach.

He played for 3 seasons (69 games, 3 goals) in the Serie A for A.S. Roma. Jose Valle was one of the best players in that era. After a brief spell with catalan clube  LLeida he signed for Portuguese clube  Lusitano de Évora. In Évora he was a part of the mythical team that gained the first promotion to the Portuguese First Division. He also helped the lusitanists gain a 7th place in their first season ever. The next season Valle would move to Porto were he remained for three seasons. In his last season at FC Porto he would still play one match in the retirement season to become Portuguese champion with the dragons.

Valle decided to remain in Portugal where he coached Leixões, Atlético CP, Vitória de Guimarães, Varzim and Braga. With Vitória de Guimarães he would lead the team to the  Portuguese Cup final in the 1962/63 season. But he would lose to Sporting 4-0.

References

External links

1920 births
1997 deaths
Argentine footballers
Argentine Primera División players
Club Atlético Atlanta footballers
Club Atlético Independiente footballers
Argentine expatriate footballers
Expatriate footballers in Italy
Argentine expatriate sportspeople in Italy
Serie A players
A.S. Roma players
Expatriate footballers in Spain
Argentine expatriate sportspeople in Spain
La Liga players
UE Lleida players
Expatriate footballers in Portugal
Argentine expatriate sportspeople in Portugal
FC Porto players
Argentine football managers
Expatriate football managers in Portugal
Leixões S.C. managers
Vitória S.C. managers
S.C. Braga managers
Varzim S.C. managers
Association football midfielders
Footballers from Buenos Aires